Rodrigo Lopresti (born September 6, 1976) is an American-Argentine actor, musician and film director who lives in Brooklyn, New York.

Biography

Personal life
Rodrigo Lopresti was born in Buenos Aires, Argentina, the youngest of two children.  Lopresti grew up in Miami, Florida. He graduated Miami Beach Senior High in 1995. Lopresti became the singer and guitar player of a surf-punk band called Garlands Room in 1994. He released an album two years later under the name The Hermitt. He played most of the instruments in the 2003 release titled & The Story of the Insects. Lopresti is also a painter.

Career
Lopresti got his start with a small role in the movie Dark Voices (2001), and since has appeared in several TV shows, Web Shorts, and commercials. He's also appeared in several movies, including Delirious and The Imperialists Are Still Alive!. His band, The Hermitt and two songs he wrote were featured in the film Last Days. Lopresti won a 2006 Best Short Film Award at the Charlotte Film Festival for the film Lucia, which he directed and played the lead role. He also directed and starred in You're Gonna Feel Funny After, a short film written by Noah Buschel
In 2011 he co-wrote, co-directed and starred in i'm not me, his first feature as a director, which was selected as part of the IFP lab of 2010 and Wroclaw's Gotham In Progress 11 projects of 2011.
 He's also had roles in Bringing Rain, The Missing Person, and Neal Cassady.

Filmography

References

1976 births
American male actors
Living people
Argentine emigrants to the United States